is a Japanese adult video (AV) studio and production company located in the Shibuya ward of Tokyo.

Company information
Maxing is an independent adult video firm which specializes in videos for sale rather than rental. The Maxing studio was founded in 2006 and released its first set of videos on October 16, 2006. An early coup for the company was the signing of AV Idol Akiho Yoshizawa who had become available in October 2006. Her first video, Sell Debut Love Acky was one of the premiere set of Maxing videos offered in October 2006. Another success was bringing back Naho Ozawa from retirement and her first video with Maxing, Naho Ozawa Encore, was also part of the October 2006 releases.

The company releases about 15 new videos per month and by September 2011, DMM, the video sales and distribution arm of the Hokuto Corporation, listed nearly 700 DVD titles under the Maxing name. In addition to DVD products, by April 2008 the company also began producing videos on Blu-ray discs and in August 2010, Maxing came out with their first videos in 3D format for the new 3D televisions, closely following the lead of S1 No. 1 Style which had released the Japanese adult industry's first 3D products in June 2010.

At the 2010 Adult Broadcasting Awards for adult material broadcast over the SKY PerfecTV! satellite network, the Maxing production  starring Yuzuka Kinoshita won the Best Program Award from among the more than 10,000 programs aired that year.

Maxing operates its own website, www.maxing.jp, which has a viewership 80% derived from Japan, although it is also popular in Hong Kong and Viet Nam.

Labels
In addition to the Maxing label, the studio has also released videos under several other labels:

 Bodyva
 Cool Sexy
 Jukebox
 MAXING 3D
 Natural Beauty
 Pretty Cute
 Roppongi

Actresses
A number of prominent AV actresses have performed in Maxing videos:

 Elly Akira
 Hikari Hino
 Kaho Kasumi
 Minako Konno
 Miho Maeshima
 Mihiro
 Nao Oikawa
 Ai Sayama
 Tsubomi
 Akiho Yoshizawa
 Maria Yumeno

Series
Video series produced by Maxing include:
 Fu-Zoku Channel (風俗ちゃんねる)

AV Open / AV Grand Prix
Maxing was one of the 19 companies which sent entries to the 2007 AV Open competition. Maxing was also one of the 39 studios which entered the GrandPrix Stage of the 2008 AV Grand Prix contest.

Notes

External links
 

Japanese pornographic film studios
Japanese companies established in 2006
Mass media companies based in Tokyo
Film production companies of Japan
Mass media companies established in 2006